Clyde River Airport  is located  northeast of Clyde River, Nunavut, Canada, and is operated by the government of Nunavut.

Airlines and destinations

References

External links
 Page about this airport on COPA's Places to Fly airport directory

Airports in the Arctic
Baffin Island
Certified airports in the Qikiqtaaluk Region